The Rivière Saumon Ouest (English: Salmon River West) is a tributary of the Saumon River, flowing only in the territory of the municipality of Notre-Dame-de-Bonsecours, in the Papineau Regional County Municipality, in the administrative region of Outaouais, in the province from Quebec, to Canada.

This small valley is mainly served by the Kenauk road (East–west direction), the Angèle Coast and the Azélie Coast.

Forestry (especially forestry) is the main economic activity in this valley.

Geography 
The West Salmon River originates from Sugar Bush Lake located in forest area.

  southerly in a straight line crossing a small, very narrow lake and collecting the discharge (coming from the west) from a small lake, to a bend in the river;
  towards the east by collecting by collecting six streams (coming from the north), up to the Red Creek (coming from the north);
  first towards the south to a bend in the river, then towards the east by forming a few serpentines, to its mouth.

From the confluence of the Saumon West river and the Saumon river, the current descends on  following the course of the Saumon river to the north bank of the Ottawa River; then on  following the course of the Ottawa River, to St. Lawrence River.

Toponymy 
The toponym "Rivière Saumon Ouest" was formalized on November 3, 1983, at the Place Names Bank of the Commission de toponymie du Québec.

See also 

 Ottawa River, a stream
 List of rivers of Quebec

References

External links 
 Official site of the municipality of Notre-Dame-de-Bonsecours

Rivers of Outaouais